Denis Gulin is a Russian Paralympic athlete. He represented Russia at the 2012 Summer Paralympics in London, United Kingdom and he won the gold medal in the men's triple jump F11 event.

He also competed at the 2012 IPC Athletics European Championships held in Stadskanaal, Netherlands winning the gold medal in the men's triple jump T11 event and the men's long jump F11 event.

References

External links 
 

Living people
Year of birth missing (living people)
Place of birth missing (living people)
Athletes (track and field) at the 2012 Summer Paralympics
Medalists at the 2012 Summer Paralympics
Paralympic gold medalists for Russia
Paralympic medalists in athletics (track and field)
Paralympic athletes of Russia
Russian male long jumpers
Russian male triple jumpers
Visually impaired long jumpers
Visually impaired triple jumpers
Paralympic long jumpers
Paralympic triple jumpers
21st-century Russian people